Väike-Õismäe (Estonian for "Lesser Blossom Hill") is a subdistrict in the district of Haabersti, Tallinn, the capital of Estonia. It has a population of 27,481. thus housing more than 60% of Haabersti's population. Väike-Õismäe is a compact microdistrict with an oval shape, built in the 1970s (architect Mart Port).

Väike-Õismäe is often informally called just Õismäe, but officially Õismäe refers to a nearby older subdistrict with a much smaller population.

Gallery

References

External links

Subdistricts of Tallinn